Gleason was an unincorporated community located  in Mineral County, West Virginia, United States.

References 

Unincorporated communities in West Virginia
Unincorporated communities in Mineral County, West Virginia
Coal towns in West Virginia